Heather Simpson (née McGinty) is a Scottish broadcast journalist and presenter, best known for her work for STV News in central Scotland.

After studying English at university, Simpson worked for CSV Media, helping to produce a number of community programming. During her time at CSV, she joined Scottish Television on a work experience placement for the regional programme, Wheel Nuts. After joining the station permanently, she started work in the Scotland Today newsroom as a news forward planner before progressing to present short news bulletins. During this time, Simpson was also a reporter for the current affairs programme Seven Days.

Simpson later became a stand-in presenter for Scotland Today and latterly, the central edition of STV News at Six, for which she was also a producer. She was also a stand-in presenter/producer for STV Central's online video blog, (Not) The Real MacKay. Simpson left STV in 2011.

References

External links

Living people
Scottish television presenters
Scottish women television presenters
STV News newsreaders and journalists
Year of birth missing (living people)